Brooke Elizabeth Burns (born March 16, 1978) is an American fashion model, game show host, actress, and television personality. Burns began her television career in 1995, portraying the supporting character Peg in the Spanish-American teen sitcom Out of the Blue (1995–1996), appearing in all episodes. Burns joined the cast of the action drama series Baywatch in 1998 and subsequently starred in Baywatchs second rendition, Baywatch: Hawaii, until she left the show owing to her first pregnancy. She appeared in 33 episodes.

After her hiatus, Burns returned to television. She appeared in several guest roles, including in the NBC sitcom Just Shoot Me!, and played a major role in the American soap opera North Shore, appearing in all 21 episodes.

Burns hosted all episodes of the NBC game show Dog Eat Dog, which aired from 2002 to 2003. She hosted 18 episodes of the Fox game show Hole in the Wall, as well as the GSN quiz show The Chase. The Chase was nominated at the 41st Daytime Emmy Awards for the Daytime Emmy Award for Outstanding Game Show, and two years later Burns was nominated for the Daytime Emmy Award for Outstanding Game Show Host. In addition to television, Burns has also appeared in minor roles in several films. She appeared in the romantic comedy Shallow Hal, the mockbuster disaster Titanic II, and the drama Where Hope Grows (2014).

Early life
Burns was born in Dallas, Texas, the daughter of Brad and Betsy Burns. She has two sisters. She was a ballet dancer for 12 years during childhood and started modeling at age 15 after tearing her anterior cruciate ligament in a skiing accident. At age 16, Burns moved with her family to Europe, living later in Paris, Milan, and Munich.

Career

Television
From 1998 to 2001, Burns starred in Baywatch and  Baywatch: Hawaii as the character Jessie Owens. In 2001, she appeared as Vicki Vale in one of several "Batman" commercials for OnStar opposite Bruce Thomas's Batman. Burns hosted NBC's Dog Eat Dog from June 2002 to August 2003 and was nominated for a Teen Choice Award. Burns starred in North Shore, a prime-time soap opera that ran for 21 episodes in 2004 and 2005. In 2006, she starred in the WB series Pepper Dennis, playing Kathy Dinkle. In 2009, Burns appeared in the first 12 episodes of the updated Melrose Place, playing Vanessa, the most recent wife of Dr. Michael Mancini (Thomas Calabro) and mother of his older son's five-year-old son, Noah. Burns was given the chance to participate in the first season of the ABC celebrity diving reality competition Splash but turned it down because of an injury she had received when diving a few years before.

Burns has also appeared on Ally McBeal, Drop Dead Diva, CSI: Miami,  To Tell the Truth, and Average Joe: Hawaii. She was nominated for an Emmy in 2016 for best game show host on the GSN game show The Chase with Mark Labbett and is currently host of Master Minds.

Film
For her role in the 2001 film Shallow Hal, the Farrelly brothers wrote a specific part for Burns after deciding during her audition that she was the "prettiest dorky girl" they'd met. She appeared in a Hallmark Channel Christmas movie, The Most Wonderful Time of the Year, co-starring Henry Winkler, on December 13, 2008. Other films include Smokejumpers, Dancing Trees, Trophy Wife, Art of Travel, and Time and Again. Burns appears in the Nickelback video "Trying Not to Love You" opposite Jason Alexander. Burns and Alexander both appeared in Shallow Hal.

Personal life
Burns grew up in Texas in a Christian family. Her father was in the oil business and also did missionary work. Burns was married to actor Julian McMahon from 1999 to 2001. McMahon is the son of the former Prime Minister of Australia Sir William McMahon. They have a daughter, Madison Elizabeth McMahon, who was born in June 2000.

Burns began dating actor Bruce Willis in April 2003. Rumoured to have become engaged in April 2004, they broke up in June 2004 after 10 months together.
 

On June 22, 2013, she married film director Gavin O'Connor. She resides in Los Angeles.

In October 2016, it was announced that Burns was expecting her second child, a girl; Burns announced that her daughter, Declan Welles O'Connor, was born January 22, 2017.

Health and injuries
On November 10, 2005, Burns broke her neck in a diving accident. Although she made a full recovery, she has a titanium fusion in her neck consisting of a plate, rod, and 10 screws. In May 2014, Burns was involved in a car crash in Los Angeles.

Charitable activities
When Burns was filming Baywatch, she was involved with Camp Baywatch, teaching inner-city children to swim and lifeguard. She also supports the Life Rolls On Foundation, an organization that aims to help people with spinal cord injuries return to an active lifestyle. In 2006, as a result of her diving injury, she became involved with the Think First National Injury Prevention Foundation and the North American Spine Society, which aim to raise awareness of spinal injuries. In 2021, Burns appeared on Celebrity Wheel of Fortune, playing for the Just Keep Livin' Foundation. The organization helps teenagers across the country.

Filmography

Film

Television

References

External links

 
 
 

Female models from Texas
American film actresses
American game show hosts
American television actresses
20th-century American actresses
21st-century American actresses
Actresses from Dallas
1978 births
Living people